Bob Harland (1 March 1916 – 26 January 2006) was an  Australian rules footballer who played with Hawthorn in the Victorian Football League (VFL).

Notes

External links 

1916 births
2006 deaths
Australian rules footballers from Victoria (Australia)
Hawthorn Football Club players